The Tuvalu national futsal team is the representative team for Tuvalu in international futsal competitions. It is controlled by the Tuvalu Islands Football Association. They have never won a game. Tuvalu participates in Oceanian Futsal Championship.

Oceanian Futsal Championship participation
The 2008 Oceanian Futsal Championship was the first time Tuvalu attended the Oceanian Futsal Championship. Team's coach in 2008 was Sami Neemia. They lost 13-1 to New Zealand, 10-2 to New Caledonia, 13-3 to Fiji and 12-0 to Solomon Islands;  and against French Polynesia the score was 1–3.

In 2010, Toakai Puapua was the coach. These games also were all lost: Vanuatu 7 - 1 Tuvalu on 8 August 2010; Tahiti Nui 4 - 0 Tuvalu on 9 August 2010;  Fiji 5 - 1 Tuvalu on 10 August 2010; New Caledonia 9 - 2 Tuvalu on 12 August 2010; New Zealand 7 - 1 Tuvalu on 13 August 2010; The last game became their largest  defeat ever, 2–21 against Solomon Islands on 14 August 2010.

In 2011, Taki Vave was the coach of the team. All three games were lost in Group B: Tahiti 6 - 0 Tuvalu on 16 May 2011; New Caledonia 11 - 1 Tuvalu on 17 May 2011;  Tuvalu 0 - 16 Solomon Islands on 18 May 2011; They played for 7th/8th place play-off against Kiribati, but lost 2–3.

Selected internationals

Oceanian Futsal Championship record

1992 to 2004– Did not enter
2008– Round 1
2009– Did not enter
2010– Round 1
2011– Round 1
2013– Did not enter
2014– Did not enter
2016– Did not enter

Current squad
The following squad was selected for the 2011 Oceanian Futsal Championship

Coaches
Sami Neemia (2008)
Toakai Puapua (2010)
Taki Vave (2011)

External links

 Tuvalu football project - Dutch Support Tuvalu Foundation (in Dutch, English, French and Spanish) 
Tuvalu national futsal team (2010)

References

Tuvalu
F
national